Robin Carl Bailhache, (born 4 May 1937 in Adelaide, South Australia), is a former Australian Test cricket match umpire.

He umpired 27 Test matches between 1974 and 1988.  His first match was between Australia and England at Brisbane on 29 November to 4 December 1974, won by Australia by 166 runs with Jeff Thomson taking 9 wickets. His partner was Tom Brooks and together they umpired all six Test matches in that series.

Bailhache’s last Test match was between Australia and the West Indies at Perth on 2 December to 6 December 1988, won by the visitors by 169 runs, in spite of Merv Hughes taking 5/130 and 8/87, including a hat-trick spread over two innings and three overs. Bailhache’s colleague was Terry Prue.

Bailhache also umpired 27 One Day International (ODI) matches between 1975 and 1989.  He umpired one women’s Test match in 1991 and one women’s ODI in 1988.

He umpired 95 first-class matches in his career between 1967 and 1992.

Bailhache was elected a Life Member of the Victorian Cricket Association Umpires and Scorers' Association (VCAUSA).

See also
Australian Test Cricket Umpires
List of Test cricket umpires
List of One Day International cricket umpires

External links
 
 
 Bailhache's thoughts on excessive appealing
 ABC report on 'chucking'

1937 births
Living people
Australian Test cricket umpires
Australian One Day International cricket umpires